Truth N' Time is a studio album by the soul singer Al Green, released in 1978. It was Green's last album of mostly secular music for many years.

The album peaked at No. 44 on the Billboard Top R&B/Hip-Hop Albums chart.

Production
Truth N' Time was recorded at Green's American Music studio. Green produced the album.

Critical reception
The Bay State Banner wrote: "The inclusion of 'To Sir With Love' and 'Say A Little Prayer' can be questioned, but Al stomps and cuts through them just like a thoroughbred racer. Some really tremendous session work also, though minus the quiet excellence of drummer Howard Grimes." 

In a 2006 review of a reissue, Rolling Stone stated that Truth n' Time "contains too much filler for an album not even twenty-seven minutes long."

Track listing
 "Blow Me Down" (Bernard Staton, Carol Staton) - 3:10
 "Lo and Behold" (Bernard Staton, Fred Jordan) - 3:15
 "Wait Here" (Green, Reuben Fairfax, Jr., Fred Jordan) - 2:45
 "To Sir with Love" (Don Black, Mark London) - 4:09
 "Truth N' Time" (Green) - 3:41 
 "King of All" (Bernard Staton, Carol Staton) - 2:23
 "I Say a Little Prayer" (Burt Bacharach, Hal David) - 2:13
 "Happy Days" (Green) - 5:13

Personnel
Al Green - vocals, lead and rhythm guitar, arrangements
Bernard Staton, James Bass - guitar
Brian Batie, Errol Thomas, James Turner - bass
Fred Jordan, Gary Lax, Jesse Butler, Johnny Brown, Purvis Leon Thomas, Charles Renard Webb - keyboards
John Toney - drums, percussion
Ron Echols - tenor and baritone saxophone
Buddy Jarrett - alto saxophone
Darryl Neely, Fred Jordan - trumpet
Buddy Jarrett, Harvey Jones, Linda Jones - backing vocals
Fred Jordan - engineer
Kinji Nishimura - photography

References

Al Green albums
1978 albums
Hi Records albums